Hardwick is a surname. Notable people with the surname include:
 Alan Hardwick, English television presenter
 Anna Elisabeth Hartwick, Swedish lace industrialist
 Ben Hardwick, liver transplant patient
 Bess of Hardwick, English noble
 Billy Hardwick, ten-pin bowler
 Charlie Hardwick, English actress
 Chris Hardwick (born 1971), American actor and comedian
 Chris Hardwick (speed cuber)
 Christopher George Hardwick, English clergyman
 Chuck Hardwick, state legislator in New Jersey 
 Damien Hardwick, Australian rules footballer
 Elizabeth Hardwick (writer), American literary critic and writer 
 George Hardwick, English soccer player
 Hank Hardwick, American football coach
 Harold Hardwick, Australian sportsman
 Huntington Hardwick, American football player
 John Hardwick, film director
 Johnny Hardwick, comedian
 Lily Norling Hardwick (1890–1944), American painter and founding member of Women Painters of Washington
 Lorna Hardwick, classicist
 Michael Hardwick (writer), English author
 Michael Hardwick, challenged sodomy laws in the U.S. state of Georgia
 Michelle Hardwick, English actress
 Mollie Hardwick, English author
 Neil Hardwick, British-born Finnish theatre and TV director and writer
 Nick Hardwick (American football)
 Omari Hardwick, American actor
 Otto Hardwick, saxophonist
 Paul Hardwick, English actor
 Peter Hardwick, Australian food horticulturist and environmentalist
 Philip Hardwick, English architect
 Philip Charles Hardwick, English architect
 Rob Hardwick, English rugby player
 Robert Hardwick, English-Canadian Anglican bishop
 Steve Hardwick, soccer player
 Taylor Hardwick, American architect
 Thomas Hardwick, Sr. (1725–1798), English master mason and architect
 Thomas Hardwick (1752–1829), English architect
 Thomas W. Hardwick (1872–1944), American politician
 Walter Hardwick, Canadian academic
 William Hardwick, Australian architect
 William G. Hardwick, American politician

See also
 Hardwicke (surname)

English-language surnames